Carl Wilhelm von Nägeli (26 or 27 March 1817 – 10 May 1891) was a Swiss botanist. He studied cell division and pollination but became known as the man who discouraged Gregor Mendel from further work on genetics. He rejected natural selection as a mechanism of evolution, favouring orthogenesis driven by a supposed "inner perfecting principle".

Birth and education
Nägeli was born in Kilchberg near Zürich, where he studied medicine at the University of Zürich. From 1839, he studied botany under A. P. de Candolle at Geneva, and graduated with a botanical thesis at Zürich in 1840. His attention having been directed by Matthias Jakob Schleiden, then professor of botany at Jena, to the microscopical study of plants, he engaged more particularly in that branch of research. He also coined the term "meristematic tissue" in 1858.

Academic career
Soon after graduation he became Privatdozent and subsequently professor extraordinary, in the University of Zürich; later he was called to fill the chair of botany at the University of Freiburg; and in 1857 he was promoted to Munich, where he remained as professor until his death.

Contributions
It was thought that Nägeli had first observed cell division during the formation of pollen, in 1842. However, this is disputed by Henry Harris, who writes: "What Nägeli saw and did not see in plant material at about the same time [as Robert Remak] is somewhat obscure... I conclude... that, unlike Remak, he did not observe nuclear division... it is clear that Nägeli did not in 1844 have any idea of the importance of the nucleus in the life of the cell."

In 1857, Nägeli first described microsporidia, the causative agent of pebrine disease in silkworms, which has historically devastated the silk industry in Europe.

Among his other contributions to science were a series of papers in the Zeitschrift für wissenschaftliche Botanik (1844–1846); Die neueren Algensysteme (1847); Gattungen einzelliger Algen (1849); Pflanzenphysiologische Untersuchungen (1855–1858), with Carl Eduard Cramer; Beiträge zur wissenschaftlichen Botanik (1858–1868); a number of papers contributed to the Royal Bavarian Academy of Sciences, forming three volumes of Botanische Mitteilungen (1861–1881); and, finally, his volume, Mechanisch-physiologische Theorie der Abstammungslehre, published in 1884. However, perhaps Nägeli is best known nowadays for his unproductive correspondence (1866–1873) with Gregor Mendel concerning the latter's celebrated work on Pisum sativum, the garden pea.

The writer Simon Mawer, in his book Gregor Mendel: planting the seeds of genetics (2006), gives us an interesting and detailed account of Nägeli's correspondence with Mendel. Mawer underlines that, at the time Nägeli was writing to the friar from Moravia, Nägeli "must have been preparing his great work entitled A mechanico-physiological theory of organic evolution (published in 1884, the year of Mendel's death) in which he proposes the concept of the 'idioplasm' as the hypothetical transmitter of inherited characters". Mawer notes that, in this Nägeli book, there is not a single mention of the work of Gregor Mendel. That prompted him to write: "We can forgive von Nägeli for being obtuse and supercilious. We can forgive him for being ignorant, a scientist of his time who did not really have the equipment to understand the significance of what Mendel had done despite the fact that he (von Nägeli) speculated extensively about inheritance. But omitting an account of Mendel's work from his book is, perhaps, unforgivable." (Mawer 2006, p. 81)

Nägeli and Hugo von Mohl were the first scientists to distinguish the plant cell wall from the inner contents, which was named the protoplasm in 1846. Nägeli believed that cells receive their hereditary characters from a part of the protoplasm which he called the idioplasma. Nägeli was an advocate of orthogenesis and an opponent of Darwinism. He developed an "inner perfecting principle" which he believed directed evolution. He wrote that many evolutionary developments were nonadaptive and variation was internally programmed.

Nägeli also coined the terms 'Meristem', 'Xylem' and 'Phloem' (all in 1858) while he and Hofmeister gave the 'Apical Cell Theory' (1846) which aimed to explain origin and functioning of the shoot apex meristem in plants.

See also
University of Freiburg Faculty of Biology

Notes

References

External links

Short biography and bibliography in the Virtual Laboratory of the Max Planck Institute for the History of Science
Biography and work (in German)
Entire facsimile text of "Mechanisch-physiologische Theorie der Abstammungslehre"

1817 births
1891 deaths
Phycologists
Botanists with author abbreviations
People from Horgen District
Swiss mycologists
Swiss nobility
Academic staff of ETH Zurich
University of Zurich alumni
Academic staff of the University of Zurich
University of Geneva alumni
Academic staff of the University of Freiburg
Academic staff of the Ludwig Maximilian University of Munich
Orthogenesis
Foreign Members of the Royal Society
19th-century Swiss botanists
Members of the Göttingen Academy of Sciences and Humanities